Terri Goss Kinzy is an American biochemist, educator and academic administrator.

Life 
Kinzy was born in Canton, Ohio. Kinzy was partly inspired by a high school physics teacher to pursue a career in science. She completed a B.S. in chemistry, magna cum laude, at the University of Akron in 1985. She was a chemist at BP America in Warrensville Heights, Ohio from 1985 to 1987, focusing on biofuel development. Kinzy completed a Ph.D. in biochemistry at the Case Western Reserve University. Her 1991 dissertation was titled Characterization of GTP and aminoacyl-tRNA binding to eukaryotic initiation factor 2 and elongation factor 1. Her doctoral advisor was William C. Merrick Ph.D. She was a postdoctoral researcher in molecular genetics at Carnegie Mellon University under advisor John L. Woolford Jr.

Kinzy describes herself as a “biochemist, molecular biologist, molecular geneticist.” She joined Rutgers University in 1995 as an assistant professor in the department of molecular genetics, microbiology, and immunology. She became a tenured professor in 2004. In 2007, she became a professor in the department of pediatrics at the Robert Wood Johnson Medical School. In her varied career at Rutgers, Kinzy also held a series of important administrative positions, including as executive director of the RWJMS DNA Synthesis and Sequencing Laboratory from 1998–2009. From May 2005 through September 2010, she was director of the RWJMS / Rutgers / Princeton University M.D. Ph.D. program. She served as the Senior Associate Dean of the Rutgers Graduate School of Biomedical Sciences from October 2007 to August 2013. That was followed by service as Associate Vice-President for Research Administration from 2013–15.

In 2016, Kinzy ascended to Vice President for Research, overseeing a 115-person staff. She was also responsible for the financial and human-resource operations of the Office of Research and Economic Development, with a staff of 300 people and an operating budget of nearly $43 million.
As she began her position, the university’s budget included $658.1 million in research expenditures for FY15, which ranked 18th among American public universities and 29th among all the nation’s universities.
In her role as Vice President, Kinzy helped increase corporate research awards by 30 percent in FY15 and another 28 percent in FY16. During that time, federal support for research at Rutgers increased 11 percent in each of those fiscal years, while Rutgers’ funding from the National Institute of Health jumped 16 percent in FY16.

In 2018, Kinzy joined Western Michigan University as its vice president for research and innovation, concurrently holding the rank of professor of biological sciences. As Vice President, Kinzy was responsible for all research operations at Western Michigan, as well as animal facilities, compliance, the university’s Evaluation Center, and technology transfer. Kinzy’s efforts helped lead to a 33 percent increase in external research expenditures from federal grants in just one year.

An internationally recognized researcher, particularly in the field of protein synthesis and drug development, Kinzy has participated in 35 funded research studies, often serving as principal investigator, that received over $9 million in federal and international funding. She has served on, or chaired, study sections for both the National Institutes of Health and the National Science Foundation.

Kinzy has co-authored 73 articles in respected scholarly journals such as Journal of Biological Chemistry, Molecular and Cellular Biology, Genetics, Nature Structural and Molecular Biology, and International Journal of Oncology. She has also co-written seventeen book chapters and reviews.

On July 1, 2021, she succeeded Larry Dietz as the 20th president of Illinois State University. She was the first female president of the university.

Awards and memberships 

Kinzy has earned international acclaim for her research and leadership. In 2016, Kinzy became a Fellow of the American Association for the Advancement of Science. S
he has also chaired the membership and public affairs advisory committees of the American Society for Biochemistry and Molecular Biology (ASBMB).

She has also served as a member of the Association for Public and Land-Grant Universities Council on Research Executive Committee. In 2003, she was named a Fellow in the prestigious Hedwig van Ameringen Executive Leadership in Academic Medicine Program.

In addition, Kinzy was selected for the University Master Educator Guild in 2001.
Further, she has also received the New Jersey Association for Biomedical Research Outstanding Mentor Award and the R. Walter Schlesinger Basic Science Mentoring Award. In a 2022 interview, Kinzy stated that honors like the Schlesinger award are the most meaningful to her, since they recognize her commitment to mentoring.

In 2004, Kinzy was named the Woman of the Year in Medicine for Somerset County, N.J., and was a Crain’s Detroit Notable Woman in STEM (Science, Technology, Engineering, and Mathematics) in 2019.

Management style 

Kinzy was described by Crain’s Detroit as “energetic, collaborative, and optimistic.” In 2019, the provost and vice president for academic affairs at Western Michigan stated that “Dr. Kinzy recognizes and appreciates scholarship in all its forms.” That same year, the director of public affairs for the ASBMB said Kinzy “is dedicated to informing our public leaders about the importance of research and the training of the next generation of scientists.”

Peers have lauded Kinzy for her communication skills, fundraising ability, and state and national advocacy of STEM and higher education. She has also won praise for her commitment to equity, diversity, and inclusion.

Known for her vision and forward-thinking, Kinzy has said that “I do not like to look at where things are as much as looking to the future and contemplating where they could be.”

Kinzy is widely respected for her dedication to student achievement. In September 2021, she said that “you can be just as excited about students winning an award for their scholarship and a faculty member recognized as your own success.”

Personal life 

Kinzy graduated from Louisville High School in Ohio in 1980. She was born across the street from the Pro Football Hall of Fame. Her father was a used-car salesman, while her mother, a vocational school graduate, worked as a bookkeeper. Kinzy was a first-generation college student.

Kinzy’s husband, Scott, is a chemist. The couple met during their undergraduate days at the University of Akron.

Personal interests for Kinzy include birding and reading science fiction.

References 

Living people
Place of birth missing (living people)
Year of birth missing (living people)
21st-century American biochemists
American women biochemists
Case Western Reserve University alumni
Rutgers University faculty
Western Michigan University faculty
Illinois State University faculty
Presidents of Illinois State University
Women heads of universities and colleges
21st-century American women scientists
Scientists from Ohio
Fellows of the American Association for the Advancement of Science
University of Akron alumni